Mykola Dmytrovych Katerynchuk is a Ukrainian politician and lawyer, a PhD in Law (Candidate of Juridical Sciences), a former member of the Verkhovna Rada (Ukrainian parliament). The Chairman of the European Party of Ukraine.

Early life
Katerynchuk was born on 19 November 1967 in the village Lugovoi in the Talmensky District (now in Russia, at the time part of the USSR).

Education
1988–1993  Graduated from the Law Faculty of the Taras Shevchenko National University of Kyiv, Qualification – Lawyer, PhD in Law (2001)
2007–2009  Master of Business Economics, National University of Life and Environmental Sciences of Ukraine

Professional
 1985–1987 Service in the Soviet Army
 1992–1995 Lawyer-consultant, INKO Bank, Kyiv
 1995–2002 Founder and General Director, Attorney Company "Moor and Krosondovich", Kyiv

Political Activities
 2002–2006 Member of Parliament of Ukraine (elected as a non-partisan), 4th Convocation, Faction "Our Ukraine", Deputy Chairman of the Committee on legal policy issues
 November–December 2004 Viktor Yushchenko's Spokesman at the Supreme Court of Ukraine trial on the appeal about recognition the results of the 2004 Presidential Elections as invalid
 2004–2005 Trustee of Victor Yushchenko during his Presidential elections 
 2005–2006 Chairman of the Central Executive Committee of "Our Ukraine" Party 
 March–September 2005 The First Deputy Chairman of the State Tax Administration of Ukraine
 2006–2007 Member of Parliament of Ukraine, 5th Convocation, Faction "Our Ukraine". Deputy Chairman of the Committee on economic policy.
 Since September 2007 Member of the political Party "European Party of Ukraine, Chairman of the Party
 November 2007-December 2012  Member of Parliament of Ukraine, 6th Convocation, Faction "Our Ukraine – People's Self-Defense", Deputy Vice-Chairman of the Committee on finance, banking, tax and customs issues 
 Since December 12, 2012 Member of Parliament of Ukraine, 7th Convocation, Member of the faction of the All-Ukrainian Union «Batkivshchyna», Deputy Chair of the Subcommittee on Administrative Legislation of the Committee on Judicial Policy

In the 2014 parliamentary election Katerynchuk was a candidate for Petro Poroshenko Bloc in single-member districts number 13 situated in Kalynivka; but lost this election with 41.29% of the votes to independent candidate Petro Yurchyshyn who gained 44.79%.

After declaring support for the candidature of Anatoliy Hrytsenko in the 2019 Ukrainian presidential election Katerynchuk became Hrytsenko's legal advisor in Hrytsenko's election headquarters.

In the July 2019 Ukrainian parliamentary election Katerynchuk is placed in the top five in the top ten of the party list of Civil Position. But the party did not win any seats (winning 1.04% of the national vote and not one constituency).

Leadership in the European party of Ukraine
December 14, 2006 Upon the invitation of the Organizing Committee of the European Movement of Ukraine over 500 representatives of different civic movements, organizations, small and medium business enterprises, students, teachers, state employees and political leaders gathered in Kyiv to found the liberal political party the European Party of Ukraine. Mykola Katerynchuk was unanimously elected the Leader of the Party. In 2013 the number of members is over 5 000. By July 2013 the European party is represented in the Verkhovna Rada of Ukraine (1 seat), in the Kyiv City Council (2 seats) and in local self-government councils (150 seats).

Public Activities
Since 2002 - initiated the Social Program "People's Attorney" in his in electoral district in Vinnytsia oblast during the Parliamentary elections. The aim is to provide free legal assistance to Ukrainian citizens. In July 2012 function 26 offices in 9 different regions of Ukraine, Kyiv and also one office in Hannover (Germany). Since the first day, the program has helped 55 thousands of citizens.

2005 - established the Tax Club that united representatives of small and medium businesses, lawyers and economists. As a result of their interaction, a draft of the Tax Code was created to simplify doing business in Ukraine and fiscal policy as a whole. Several times a bill was introduced to Parliament. Though the Azarov's Tax Code was adopted that led to the mass protest ("Tax Maidan") in 2010.

International political activities
2009:

February Joined the 3rd Economic Forum of Europe - Ukraine in Kyiv

 April In the framework of official visit to Brus¬sels and Strasbourg took part in the official start of the ELDR campaign for the European Parliament, met with the leader of the Alliance of Liberals and Democrats for Europe Mr. Graham Watson.

 November Head of the European Party of Ukraine delegation to the ELDR Con¬gress held in Barcelona, Spain.

2010:

April 12-day trial visit to the European Parliament in Strasbourg and Brussels, a number of meetings with MPs-members of ALDE.

 October Head of the European Party of Ukraine delegation to the ELDR Congress held in Helsinki, Finland.

2011:

April  Head of the European Party of Ukraine delegation to Georgia, meetings with government officials and parliamentarians, discussions about Georgian reforms and Ukraine-Georgia cooperation issues.

 May Official visit to Brussels together with representatives of the European Party of Ukraine within "Ukraine-EU Parlia¬mentary Club", parliamentary meetings with European colleagues. Submission during this visit the application of the European Party of Ukraine to the ELDR "On acquiring the status of associate member".

August Participation in the forum "Ukraine-EU Parlia¬mentary Club", held in Ukraine. 14 MEPs from different factions and representatives of the Ukrainian parliament took part in the event.

October  Official visit to Brussels, meetings with European counterparts.

2012:

25–26 May One of the initiators, organizers and participant of the international political conference "Liberal Democracy in Ukraine. On the Road to the European Integration" held in Odessa, Ukraine

2013:

 10–11 May Head of the European Party of Ukraine delegation to ALDE Party Council, Pula, Chroatia. There the European Party of Ukraine got a full membership in ALDE Party.

 Since July Member of the Parliamentarians Network for Conflict Prevention

Awards
2007 State Order "For Perfect Service" of the third level

Notes

References

External links
Parliamentarians Network for Conflict Prevention
European party of Ukraine
Official site of Mykola Katerynchuk
Alliance of Liberals and Democrats for Europe Party
Liberal democracy in Ukraine
Gazeta.ua
http://megogo.net/
Verkhovna Rada of Ukraine

1967 births
Living people
People from Talmensky District
Our Ukraine (political party) politicians
European Party of Ukraine politicians
Fourth convocation members of the Verkhovna Rada
Fifth convocation members of the Verkhovna Rada
Sixth convocation members of the Verkhovna Rada
Seventh convocation members of the Verkhovna Rada
People of the Orange Revolution
People of the Euromaidan
20th-century Ukrainian lawyers
Taras Shevchenko National University of Kyiv alumni